Eileen Christina "Bibi" Zillmer (born December 15, 1952) is a former competitive figure skater who represented West Germany for most of her career. She is a three-time (1969–71) national champion and competed at the 1968 Winter Olympics in Grenoble, France; Zillmer placed 12th in compulsory figures, 23rd in free skating, and 19th overall. She finished in the top ten at four ISU Championships – 1969 Worlds in Colorado Springs, Colorado, USA; 1969 Europeans in Garmisch-Partenkirchen, West Germany; 1970 Europeans in Leningrad, Soviet Union; and 1971 Europeans in Zürich, Switzerland.

Zillmer was born in West Point, New York, the daughter of Madeleine (née Mueller) and David Zillmer. She was coached by her mother. Her brother, Eric, competed in downhill skiing.

Competitive highlights

References 

1952 births
Olympic figure skaters of West Germany
Figure skaters at the 1968 Winter Olympics
German female single skaters
Living people
People from West Point, New York